Lisa Kleypas (born 5 November 1964 in Temple, Texas) is a best-selling American author of historical and contemporary romance novels. In 1985, she was named Miss Massachusetts 1985 and competed in the Miss America 1986 pageant in Atlantic City.

Biography
Lisa Kleypas was born on 5 November 1964 in Temple, Texas, to Linda and Lloyd Kleypas, an architect. She began writing her own romance novels during her summer breaks from studying political science at Wellesley College. Her parents agreed to support her for a few months after her graduation so that she could finish her latest manuscript. Approximately two months later, at age 21, Kleypas sold her first novel.

The same year she sold her first novel, Kleypas was named Miss Massachusetts. During her competition at the Miss America pageant, Kleypas performed a song she had written, earning her a "talented nonfinalist" award.

Kleypas has been a full-time romance writer since 1985. Her novels have ranked high on major best-seller lists, sold millions of copies around the globe and have been translated into fourteen different languages.

In October 1998, Kleypas's Texas home flooded within a matter of hours after heavy rains inundated their town. She and her family lost everything except the clothes they were wearing and her purse. Within days, her colleagues at Avon sent boxes of clothes and books to help the family recover. For Kleypas though, the defining moment was after the flood, when she and her mother (whose home had also flooded), made a quick trip to the store to purchase toothbrushes, clean clothes, and other necessities. Separately, each of them had also chosen a romance novel, a necessity to them in helping them escape the stress they were currently under. To Kleypas, this realization validated her decision to write romance novels instead of more literary works.

Though primarily known for her historical romance novels, Kleypas made an announcement in early 2006 concerning her momentary departure from historical romances to delve into the contemporary romance genre. Kleypas has since written two additional historical romance series: "The Hathaways" and "The Ravenels", as well as an additional contemporary romance series, the "Travis Series."

Kleypas lives in Washington with her husband, Gregory Ellis, and their two children, Griffin and Lindsay.

Bibliography

Many of Kleypas's works are arranged into series. However, even books in different series often have common elements, such as the Westcliffs, Mrs. Bradshaw, Jenner's, Mathilda, and the Wallflowers.

Berkley-Falkner series

Where Passion Leads (1987)
Forever My Love (1988)

Only Vallerand series
Only in Your Arms (1992) (republished as When Strangers Marry (2002)) annotation
Only with Your Love (1992) annotation

Gamblers of Craven's series
Then Came You (1993) annotation
Dreaming of You (1994) annotation
Against the Odds in the Anthology Where's My Hero with Julia Quinn and Kinley MacGregor (2003) annotation

Stokehurst Family series
Midnight Angel (1995) annotation
Prince of Dreams (1995) annotation

Capitol Theatre series
Somewhere I'll Find You (1996) annotation
Because You're Mine (1997) annotation
I Will in the anthology Wish List with Lisa Cach, Claudia Dain and Lynsay Sands (2001) annotation

Bow-Street Runners series
Someone to Watch Over Me (1999) annotation
Lady Sophia's Lover (2002) annotation
Worth Any Price (2003) annotation

Wallflower series
Again the Magic (2004) annotation 
Secrets of a Summer Night (2005) annotation
It Happened One Autumn (2005) annotation
Devil in Winter (2006) annotation
Scandal in Spring (2006) annotation
A Wallflower Christmas (2008) annotation

The Hathaways series

 Mine Till Midnight (2007) annotation
 Seduce Me at Sunrise (2008) annotation
 A Hathaway Wedding (short story) (2009)
 Tempt Me at Twilight (2009) annotation
 Married By Morning (2010) annotation
 Love In The Afternoon (2010) annotation

The Ravenels series
Cold-Hearted Rake (2015) annotation
Marrying Winterborne (2016) annotation
Devil in Spring (2017)
Hello Stranger (2018)
Devil's Daughter (2019)
Chasing Cassandra (2020)
Devil in Disguise (2021)

Other historical romance novels
Love, Come to Me (1988) annotation
Give Me Tonight (1989)
Stranger in My Arms (1998) annotation
Where Dreams Begin (2000) annotation
Suddenly You (2001) annotation
Again the Magic (2004) is the story of the sisters of the main character, Earl of Westcliff of It Happened One Autumn. annotation

Novellas and anthologies
Surrender (1991, novella) in the anthology "Christmas Love Stories" (1991) with Diane Wicker Davis, Shannon Drake, Kay Hooper
Surrender in the 1994 anthology "A Christmas Present" with Loretta Chase and Judith E French
Promises (1995, novella) in the anthology "Three Weddings and a Kiss" with Catherine Anderson, Loretta Chase and Kathleen E. Woodiwiss
I Will (2001, novella) in the anthology Wish List with Lisa Cach, Claudia Dain and Lynsay Sands
Against the Odds (2003, novella) part of the Craven series, in the anthology "Where's My Hero?" with Kinley MacGregor and Julia Quinn
Surrender in the 2006 anthology "Gifts of Love" with Kay Hooper
I Will in the 2008 anthology "A Historical Christmas Present" with Leigh Greenwood and Lynsay Sands
 I Will in the 2017 anthology "A Christmas to Remember" with Vivienne Lorret, Megan Frampton and Lorraine Heath

Travis series (contemporary)
Sugar Daddy (2007) annotation
Blue Eyed Devil (2008) annotation
Smooth Talking Stranger (2009) annotation
Brown-Eyed Girl (2015) annotation

Friday Harbor (contemporary)
Christmas Eve at Friday Harbor (Oct 26, 2010) annotation
Rainshadow Road (Feb 28, 2012) annotation
Dream Lake (Aug 2012) annotation
Crystal Cove (Feb 2013) annotation

Awards
1998 – Waldenbooks Award for greatest sales growth, Someone to Watch Over Me
1999 – Romance Writers of America RITA Award finalist, Someone to Watch Over Me
2002 – Romance Writers of American RITA Award finalist, Suddenly You
2002 – Romance Writers of America RITA Award winner for her Christmas anthology novella in Wish List
2002 – Romantic Times Magazine Best Sensuous Historical Romance, Lady Sophia's Lover
2002 – Publishers Weekly starred reviews for Lady Sophia's Lover and When Strangers Marry
2003 – Publishers Weekly starred review, Worth Any Price
2003 – Amazon Editor's Top Ten Picks forBest Romance of 2003, Where's My Hero and Worth Any Price
2004 – Romance Writers of America RITA Award for best Short Historical, Worth Any Price
2004 – Publishers Weekly starred review, Secrets of a Summer Night
2006 – Romance Writers of America RITA Award finalist, Short Historical Category, It Happened One Autumn
2007 – Romance Writers of America RITA Award finalist, Short Historical Category, The Devil in Winter and Scandal in Spring

Television
2012 – Christmas with Holly, based on the novel Christmas at Friday Harbor annotation

References

External links
Official Lisa Kleypas website
Chapter excerpts and title list (Official publisher web page)
A Conversation with Lisa Kleypas (Interview with Author)

1964 births
Living people
20th-century American novelists
21st-century American novelists
American historical novelists
American romantic fiction novelists
American women novelists
Miss America 1980s delegates
RITA Award winners
Wellesley College alumni
Novelists from Massachusetts
Women romantic fiction writers
20th-century American women writers
21st-century American women writers
Women historical novelists